Richard Mott may refer to:
 Richard Mott (politician)
 Richard Mott (statistician)